Alexeyevka is a rural locality (a village) in Karmaskalinsky Selsoviet, Karmaskalinsky District, Bashkortostan, Russia. The population was 68 as of 2010. There is 1 street.

Geography 
Alexeyevka is located 8 km northeast of Karmaskaly (the district's administrative centre) by road. Ural is the nearest rural locality.

References 

Rural localities in Karmaskalinsky District